The Alexander is a cocktail consisting of gin or brandy, cocoa liqueur (crème de cacao), and cream. A variation, the Brandy Alexander, uses cognac instead of gin.

History
There are at least two drinks from the early 20th century, which were known by the name 'Alexander', but which are nevertheless different drinks. In Jack's Manual on The Vintage & Production, Care & Handling of Wines, Liquors &c. (1910) by Jacob Abraham Grohusko, the 'Alexander Cocktail' is described as three parts rye whiskey, one part Bénédictine, with a piece of ice and a twist of orange peel. In Recipes for Mixed Drinks (1915) by Hugo Ensslin, a drink by the same name is made with equal parts of gin, white crème de cacao and sweet cream; shaken with ice, and strained.

The Alexander was originally made with gin, but the modern version is usually made with brandy and is called a Brandy Alexander. The International Bartenders Association calls for brandy in its Alexander.

Variations
The Coffee Alexander substitutes coffee liqueur (such as Kahlúa) for crème de cacao. The Blue Alexander substitutes blue Curaçao for crème de cacao. The Brandy Alexander substitutes gin some form of brandy, other variations also exist.

See also

 List of cocktails
 List of cocktails (alphabetical)
 List of IBA official cocktails

References

Cocktails with chocolate liqueur
Cocktails with gin